The Columbia Journal of Law & the Arts (JLA) is a quarterly, student-edited law review published at Columbia Law School. The Journal publishes articles and notes dedicated to in-depth coverage of current legal issues in the art, entertainment, sports, intellectual property, and communications industries. It features contributions by scholars, judges, practitioners, and students. 

JLA is affiliated with the Kernochan Center for Law, Media, and the Arts and the Entertainment, Arts, and Sports Law Society at Columbia Law School. Its Board of Advisors includes June M. Besek, Gilbert S. Edelson, Professor Jane C. Ginsburg, Trey Hatch, Morton L. Janklow, Adria G. Kaplan, Philippa Loengard, and David Leichtman.

Impact 
Founded in 1975, the Columbia Journal of Law & the Arts is devoted to arts, entertainment, and sports law, with 536 journal cites between 2010 and 2017. As of June 2021, the Columbia Journal of Law & the Arts is the highest-ranking secondary journal at Columbia Law School and the highest-ranking journal in the world in its field. JLA has been cited by the Supreme Court and the Fifth Circuit Court of Appeals.

Leadership

See also 
 List of law journals
 List of law reviews in the United States
 List of intellectual property law journals

References

External links 
 Official website
 Columbia Law School
 Student Journals at Columbia Law School

American law journals
Intellectual property law journals
Columbia Law School
Columbia University academic journals
Publications established in 1975
English-language journals
Law journals edited by students
Quarterly journals
Art and culture law